Jorge Sebastian Heiland (born 5 February 1987) is an Argentine professional boxer and the current WBC International middleweight champion.

Professional boxing
He made his debut in 2007, defeating Ceferino Juan Jose Coronel by UD decision. In 2009, Heiland won vacant WBC Latino middleweight title, defeating Gaston Alejandro Vega.

On November 29, 2013, he won the vacant WBC International middleweight title, defeating Billi Facundo Godoy.

He reached the number one spot in the WBC rankings, but was defeated by Jermall Charlo in a title eliminator on 29 July 2017.

Professional record

References

1987 births
Living people
Middleweight boxers
Argentine male boxers
Southpaw boxers